Dongbei Special Steel Group Co., Ltd. is a state-owned enterprise based in Dalian, Liaoning Province (the south most city of Northeastern China or Dongbei). It was owned by State-owned Assets Supervision and Administration Commission (SASAC) of the Provincial Government of Liaoning (46.1230%) and Heilongjiang (14.5191%), as well as a subsidiary of Liaoning SASAC (22.6839%) and China Orient Asset Management (16.6740%).

The company was formed by the merger of Dalian Special Steel (aka Liaoning Special Steel Group) and Beiman Special Steel Group (literally North Manchuria Special Steel) in 2004. Dongbei Special Steel became the holding company of the two steel maker, plus Fushun Special Steel, a subsidiary of Liaoning Special Steel Group.

In 2016 the enterprise defaulted several times. Chairman Yang Hua committed suicide in March 2016, four days before the first default.

Subsidiaries
 Dalian Special Steel Co., Ltd. (100%)
 Beiman Special Steel Co., Ltd. (58.63%)
 Shanghai Special Steel Co., Ltd. (99.67%) - wholesaler and retailer of Dongbei Special Steel in Shanghai City

Equity investment
Dongbei Special Steel owned 38.58% stake in Fushun Special Steel, based in Fushun, Liaoning, as the largest shareholder. The shares of the company float in Shanghai Stock Exchange.

References

External links
  

Steel companies of China
Companies based in Liaoning
Chinese companies established in 2004
Companies owned by the provincial government of China
China Orient Asset Management
2004 establishments in China